Local elections was held in the City of Manila on May 14, 2007, within the Philippine general election. The voters will elect for the elective local posts in the city: the mayor, vice mayor, the six Congressmen, and the councilors, six in each of the city's six legislative districts.

References 

2007 elections in the Philippines
Elections in Manila
Politics of Manila
2007 elections in Metro Manila